The School of Fine Arts or College of Fine Arts is the official name or part of the name of several schools of fine arts, often as an academic part of a larger university. These include:

The Americas

North America 
Alabama School of Fine Arts
Carnegie Mellon College of Fine Arts,  Carnegie Mellon University
Escuela de Artes Plásticas y Diseño de Puerto Rico
Lyme Academy College of Fine Arts, Old Lyme, Connecticut
New York University Institute of Fine Arts
San Francisco Art Institute, formally named "California School of Fine Arts"
School of the Art Institute of Chicago
School of the Museum of Fine Arts at Tufts, Tufts University
University of Florida College of Fine Arts
University of Iowa School of Art and Art History
University of Kentucky College of Fine Arts
 Weitzenhoffer Family College of Fine Arts, University of Oklahoma
University of Texas at Austin College of Fine Arts
Vermont College of Fine Arts
Yale School of Art, Yale University

Asia

Iran 

 University of Tehran, College of Fine Arts, Tehran, Iran

Iraq
Baghdad College of Fine Arts

Philippines
University of Santo Tomas College of Fine Arts and Design

Sri Lanka 

 University of the Visual and Performing Arts, former name was " Colombo College of Fine Arts"

Europe

Belgium 
Hogeschool Sint-Lukas Brussel

Denmark
Royal Danish Academy of Fine Arts
 Funen Art Academy
 Jutland Art Academy

France 
École des Beaux-Arts (School of Fine Arts) is a name borne by art schools in several French cities
 École nationale supérieure des beaux-arts de Lyon
 École nationale supérieure des Beaux-Arts, de Paris (French National School of Fine Arts)

Germany 
 Berlin University of the Arts
 Braunschweig University of Art
 Munich Academy of Fine Arts
 Düsseldorf Academy of Fine Arts

Greece 

 Athens School of Fine Arts

Italy 
Brera Academy
School of Fine Arts at the American Academy in Rome
Florence Academy of Art, School of fine arts Italy

Netherlands 
Academie Minerva, Groningen
, Enschede; part of ArtEZ Institute of the Arts
AKV St. Joost, 's-Hertogenbosch and Breda
Amsterdam University of the Arts
ArtEZ Institute of the Arts, Arnhem en Zwolle
, Zwolle
Design Academy, Eindhoven
, Tilburg
Gerrit Rietveld Academie, Amsterdam
Jan Van Eyck Academie, Maastricht
Maastricht Academy of Fine Arts
Rijksakademie van Beeldende Kunsten, Amsterdam
Royal Academy of Art, The Hague
Utrecht School of the Arts
Willem de Kooning Academie (WDKA), Rotterdam

Poland 

 Jan Matejko Academy of Fine Arts in Kraków
 Eugeniusz Geppert Academy of Fine Arts in Wrocław
 Academy of Fine Arts In Łódź
 Academy of Fine Arts in Warszawa
 Magdalena Abakanowicz University of the Arts Poznan
 Academy of Fine Arts in Gdańsk
 Art Academy in Szczecin
  Academy of Fine Arts in Katowice

Sweden 
Valand School of Fine Arts

United Kingdom
Slade School of Fine Art, University College London
Heatherley School of Fine Art, London
School of Fine Art, History of Art and Cultural Studies of University of Leeds
School of Fine Art and Photography of University for the Creative Arts
School of Fine Art of Glasgow School of Art
Birmingham School of Fine Art, former name of Birmingham School of Art

Australia and New Zealand 
 Elam School of Fine Arts, University of Auckland (Auckland, New Zealand)
 Ilam School of Fine Arts, University of Canterbury (Christchurch, New Zealand)
 UNSW Art & Design, University of New South Wales (Sydney, Australia); previously the UNSW College of Fine Arts

Types of university or college
Art schools